Heather MacLean (born August 31, 1995) is an American middle distance runner.

From Peabody, Massachusetts and an alumna of the University of Massachusetts, MacLean is based in Boston, Massachusetts.

NCAA
In college at the University of Massachusetts, MacLean placed 10th at 2018 NCAA Division I Outdoor Track and Field Championships 1500 meters.

She earned NCAA Division I All-American cross country honors at 2017 NCAA Division I Cross Country Championships (the school's first woman to do so), and established records for 800 m, 1000 m, 1500 m and the mile and also qualified for the NCAA Championships in track and cross country. She was a finalist for 2018 NCAA Woman of the Year award. 

MacLean placed 9th at the 2016 NCAA Division I Indoor Track and Field Championships mile.

Professional
In 2019, MacLean was seventh at the USA Outdoor Championships 1500m, setting a personal best of 4:05.27. At the 2020 NYRR Wanamaker Mile, she finished sixth, clocking a personal best of 4:25.98 which placed her 15th on the U.S. women's all-time indoor list.

MacLean won the Blankenship Women's Mile in 4:27.54 at the 2021 American Track League meet number 2 in Fayetteville and also the 1500 meters in 4:06.32 at the New Balance Indoor Grand Prix held in New York. At the delayed 2020 U.S. Olympic Trials held in Eugene, Oregon, on June 21, 2021, she finished third in the women's 1500 m race (4:02.09) behind Elle Purrier St. Pierre and Cory McGee to secure a place at the 2020 Summer Olympics in Tokyo. At the Games, MacLean was eliminated in the semi-finals with a time of 4:05.33.

In February 2023 at the New Balance Indoor Grand Prix in Boston, racing in the women’s mile, MacLean edged out Canadian Lucia Stafford to win in a world-leading and personal best time of 4:23.42.

Personal bests
 800 metres – 1:59.72 (Walnut, CA 2021)
 800 metres indoor – 2:00.53 (Fayetteville, AR 2021)
 1500 metres – 3:58.76 (Brussels 2022)
 1500 metres indoor – 4:05.29 (Boston, MA 2020)
 One mile – 4:31.13 (Birmingham 2019)
 One mile indoor – 4:23.42 (Boston, MA 2023)

References

External links 
 
 Heather MacLean bio University of Massachusetts Amherst Athletics
 Heather MacLean UMASS Amhearst Results TFRRS
 Heather MacLean bio The Sports

1995 births
Living people
American female middle-distance runners
People from Peabody, Massachusetts
UMass Minutemen and Minutewomen athletes
University of Massachusetts Amherst alumni
Track and field athletes from Massachusetts
World Athletics Championships athletes for the United States
Athletes (track and field) at the 2020 Summer Olympics
Olympic track and field athletes of the United States
21st-century American women